The Missing American is a novel written by Ghanaian-American novelist Kwei Quartey first published in 2020 by Soho Press.

References

2020 American novels
Novels set in Ghana
Soho Press books